Vulcan Software was an independent computer games company founded in 1994 in the UK. Vulcan started creating software for the Amiga computer systems. Its first commercial game was Valhalla and the Lord of Infinity, which was notable for being the first ever Amiga speech adventure game. In January 1999, Vulcan Software started development for PC computer systems. The Director of Vulcan Software is Paul Carrington. In 2007, Vulcan announced a partnership with Amiga, Inc to develop older Amiga games for PCs and other devices.

Games
Valhalla and the Lord of Infinity
Valhalla: Before the War
Valhalla and the Fortress of Eve
Timekeepers
JetPilot
Burnout
Tiny Troops
Hillsea Lido
Genetic Species
The Strangers
Uropa²: The Ulterior Colony
Final Odyssey: Theseus Verses The Minotaur

Third Party Creations Linked to Valhalla
It's a skull

References

External links

Defunct video game companies of the United Kingdom
Video game companies established in 1994
1994 establishments in England